Tim Gajser (born 8 September 1996) is a Slovenian professional motocross racer. He has competed in the FIM Motocross World Championships since 2012. Gajser is notable for being a five-time motocross world champion.

Motocross career

Gajser previously competed for the Gariboldi Honda motocross racing team managed by Giacomo Gariboldi. In the 2015 FIM Motocross World Championship season, he won his first world championship in the MX2. Gajser moved up to the MX1 class and won the 2016 MX1 Motocross World Championship. Gajser now currently competes under Team HRC and won the 2019 and 2020 season with them.

2022 Tim Gajser became crowned world champion in the grand prix of Finland for the 5th time of his career even though it was 2 gp to go because of the unbeatable number of points.

Personal life

Gajser was born in Ptuj, Slovenia, and is a native of Makole, a small settlement roughly 20 kilometers to the southwest. His father Bogomir was also a motocross rider and introduced his son to the sport at a young age. He remains his coach to this day.

Gajser has one older brother Nejc, and two younger sisters Alja and Neja. In 1995 his family went through a tragedy when his 3-year-old brother Žan was killed in a racing accident. During a race the young boy wandered on a track below one of the jumps and was hit in the temple by his father's motorcycle during landing and killed instantly. Gajser rides with the number 243 in honor of his deceased brother, who was born on 24 March.

Gajser maintains a close friendship with MotoGP world champion Marc Marquez, having met the Spaniard through their mutual relationship with Honda Racing Corporation. Despite having ridden motorcycles since he was three years old, Gasjer does not have a motorcycle license and has never ridden a motorcycle on public roads.

Career statistics

2007: 1st place on UEM EMX 65cc European Championship
2009: 1st place on UEM EMX 85cc European Championship
2012: 1st place on FIM MOTOCROSS 125 JUNIOR WORLD CHAMPIONSHIP & 1. place on UEM EMX 125 European Championship
2014: 5th place on FIM Motocross World Championship MX2
2015: World Championship MX2
2016: World Championship MXGP
2017: 7th place on World Championship MXGP
2018: 4th place on World Championship MXGP
2019: World Championship MXGP
2020: World Championship MXGP
2021: 3rd place on World Championship MXGP
2022: World Championship MXGP

By season

MX2

2012

2013

2014

2015

MXGP

2016

2017

2018